Sumantri Brojonegoro Stadium (Indonesian: Stadion Soemantri Brodjonegoro) is a multi-use stadium in South Jakarta, DKI Jakarta, Indonesia. It is currently used mostly for football matches and is used as the home stadium for PSJS South Jakarta. The stadium has a capacity of 5,000 people.

The stadium has been used for various purposes. On 24 May 2001, Irish vocal pop band Westlife held a concert for their Where Dreams Come True Tour supporting their album Coast to Coast. Final round of the AQUA Danone Nations Cup 2018 was held in this stadium. 2017-18 IBL Finals game 2 and 3 was also held in this statdium.

References

Football venues in Indonesia
Athletics (track and field) venues in Indonesia
Sports venues in Indonesia
Multi-purpose stadiums in Indonesia
Football venues in Jakarta
Sports venues in Jakarta